The Grafenrheinfeld nuclear power plant is a now-offline electricity-generating facility near Grafenrheinfeld, south of Schweinfurt at the river Main. The plant operated from 1981 to June 28, 2015, when it was taken offline as part of the phase out policy for nuclear power in Germany.

Construction and history
Construction took place between 1974 and 1981, which cost around 2.5 billion DM. The reactor, a German third-generation pressurized water reactor with an electrical net power output of 1,345 megawatts, achieved first criticality on December 9, 1981.

The plant is managed by PreussenElektra GmbH. As with almost all other nuclear plants, temporary storage facilities for spent nuclear fuel are present on site. There is an information center at the power station.

Under the phase out policy for nuclear power in Germany, the plant was scheduled to shut down on 31 December 2015. Citing economical reasons, E.ON declared intent to shut down the plant earlier, originally at end of May 2015.

Plant taken offline
The Grafenrheinfeld plant was taken offline on June 28, six months before scheduled to close on December 3, 2015 as part of Germany's ongoing policy to shut all nuclear power plants down in the country by 2022. The plant owners decided it was uneconomic to continue operation as planned.

In the media
In the anti-nuclear teen novel Die Wolke (1987), the power plant undergoes a meltdown.

References

Former nuclear power stations in Germany
Economy of Bavaria
Schweinfurt (district)